Serhat Gülpınar (born January 1, 1979) is a Turkish football coach and a former player.

References

1979 births
Living people
Turkish footballers
Denizlispor footballers
İstanbul Başakşehir F.K. players
MKE Ankaragücü footballers
Süper Lig players
Association football midfielders
Turkish football managers
Elazığspor managers
Denizlispor managers